Closed Doors is a 1921 American silent drama film directed by Gustav von Seyffertitz and starring Alice Calhoun and Harry C. Browne.

Cast
 Alice Calhoun as Dorothy Brainerd
 Harry C. Browne as Jim Ranson
 Bernard Randall as Rex Gordon
 A.J. Herbert as Muffler Mike
 Betty Burwell as Jane
 Charles Brook as Dan Syrles

References

Bibliography
 Connelly, Robert B. The Silents: Silent Feature Films, 1910-36, Volume 40, Issue 2. December Press, 1998.
 Munden, Kenneth White. The American Film Institute Catalog of Motion Pictures Produced in the United States, Part 1. University of California Press, 1997.

External links
 

1921 films
1921 drama films
1920s English-language films
American silent feature films
Silent American drama films
American black-and-white films
Films directed by Gustav von Seyffertitz
Vitagraph Studios films
1920s American films